Luca Grünwald (born 10 November 1994) is a German motorcycle racer. 
At international level, he competed in the 125cc and Moto3 classes of Grand Prix motorcycle racing, the Supersport 300 World Championship and the Supersport World Championship. At national level, he competed in the ADAC Junior Cup (winning the series in 2007), the IDM 125GP Championship, the IDM Moto3 Championship where he won the titles in 2010 and 2012 respectively, the IDM Supersport Championship (where he was champion in 2020), the IDM Superstock 1000 Championship and the IDM Superbike Championship.

Career statistics

Grand Prix motorcycle racing

By season

Races by year
(key) (Races in bold indicate pole position; races in italics indicate fastest lap)

Supersport World Championship

Races by year
(key) (Races in bold indicate pole position; races in italics indicate fastest lap)

References

External links

 

German motorcycle racers
Living people
1994 births
125cc World Championship riders
Moto3 World Championship riders
Supersport 300 World Championship riders
Supersport World Championship riders